Jeevaanandam Thangamuthu was the third  Bishop of Coimbatore.

Notes

 

20th-century Anglican bishops in India
Indian bishops
Indian Christian religious leaders
Anglican bishops of Coimbatore